Ornipholidotos ivoiriensis is a butterfly in the family Lycaenidae. It is found in southern Ivory Coast. The habitat consists of forests.

References

Butterflies described in 2005
Taxa named by Michel Libert
Ornipholidotos
Endemic fauna of Ivory Coast
Butterflies of Africa